

League tables

Group A

Norte Oeste

Centro Levante

Group B

I

II

III

IV

V

VI

Promotion playoff

First round

Second round

Third round

Tiebreakers

Final Round

Notes

External links
LFP website

Tercera División seasons
3
Spain